Power Serve 3D Tennis  is a video game developed by SPS and published by Ocean Software for the PlayStation.

Gameplay
Power Serve 3D Tennis has polygonal figures and numerous camera angles.

Reception
Next Generation reviewed the PlayStation version of the game, rating it three stars out of five, and stated that "Unfortunately, it's not the best-playing tennis game ever. Only a few of the camera angles are workable, and some are, in fact, totally ridiculous. Beyond that, the action is sluggish and play controls are far from intuitive.  With time it can be rewarding, but it does take practice."

Reviews
GamePro (Dec, 1995)
IGN - Nov 25, 1996

Notes

References

External links 
 Power Serve 3D Tennis at GameFAQs
 Power Serve 3D Tennis at Giant Bomb
 Power Serve 3D Tennis at MobyGames

1995 video games
Ocean Software games
PlayStation (console) games
PlayStation (console)-only games
Tennis video games
Video games developed in Japan